Super Ninja Boy  is an action role-playing game released for the Super NES. It features random encounters with side-scrolling battles, although some boss battles are fought with a traditional menu-based system. There are also a few platforming sections.

In single-player mode, the main character is Jack. The game can be switched between single player and multiplayer at will, with the second player controlling Ryu. Jack and Ryu share statistics, so one character never overpowers the other.

Super Ninja Boy features a password system to record progress.

It is a sequel to Culture Brain's previous title, Little Ninja Brothers for the NES and contains a few cameos from other Culture Brain's games.

Gameplay
Super Ninja Boy combines classic role-playing video game elements with action game elements. The player controls the main character Jack (or two players can control both Jack and Ryu) and randomly encounters enemies on the world map and in dungeons. In side-scrolling battles, the player can jump, punch, throw enemies, use items like shurikens or techniques such as the super jump or fireball. Battles take place in a beat'em up style and end after a specific number of enemies are killed (no matter how many are still remaining on screen). Boss battles are fought in a turn-based RPG style, using the same items and skills as normally.

There are also some 2D platform areas, which play the same as the normal battles without depth (the player can only go right or left).

External links

Composer information for Super Ninja Boy at SMS Power

Notes

 Known in Japan as 

Role-playing video games
Satellaview games
Super Chinese
Super Nintendo Entertainment System games
Multiplayer and single-player video games
Video games about ninja
Video games developed in Japan
Virtual Console games
Virtual Console games for Wii U
Action role-playing video games
1991 video games